WATK (900 AM) is a radio station  broadcasting a classic hits format. Licensed to Antigo, Wisconsin, United States.  The station is currently owned by Results Broadcasting, Inc.

History
WATK switched from classic country to adult standards in October 2009. The station broadcast the America's Best Music satellite feed from Westwood One.

On October 27, 2014, WATK changed their format from adult standards to classic hits, branded as "Classic Hits 98.7" (now simulcasting on FM translator W254AX 98.7 FM Antigo).

References

External links

ATK
Classic hits radio stations in the United States
Radio stations established in 1948